Geraldo Azevedo (born January 11, 1945) is a Brazilian singer, songwriter and guitarist. He is famous for his contributions to the Brazilian popular music (MPB) scene, especially his partnerships with Alceu Valença and Zé Ramalho.

Discography 
 Alceu Valença e Geraldo Azevedo (1972)
 Geraldo Azevedo
 Bicho-de-sete-cabeças
 Inclinações musicais
 For all para todos (1982)
 Tempo tempero (1983)
 A luz do solo (1984)
 Cantoria I (1984)
 Eterno presente (1988)
 Bossa tropical (1989)
 Berekekê (1991)
 Raízes e frutos
 Ao vivo comigo (1994)
 Futuramérica (1996)
 O grande encontro 1 (1996)
 O grande encontro 2 (1997)
 O grande encontro 3 (2000)
 Hoje amanhã (2000)
 O Brasil existe em mim (2007)

External links 
 

1945 births
Living people
20th-century Brazilian male singers
20th-century Brazilian singers
Brazilian songwriters
People from Petrolina